Howard King may refer to:

Howard King (public-address announcer) (1932–2016), public-address announcer for the Michigan Wolverines football team
Howard King (Jurassic Park), fictional character from Jurassic Park
Howard King (referee) (born 1946), English football referee
Howard King (boxer), American boxer active in 1950s and 60s
Howie King (born 1969), Irish soccer player